Adèle Riché (1791–1878) was a French painter.

Riché was born, and lived her life in France. A pupil of Jan Frans van Dael and Gerard van Spaendonck., she is known for her still life paintings, including watercolors, as well as her portraits. Her techniques included botanical, entomological, and natural painting, oil, watercolor, and on vellum, and engraving, as well as hand-colouring.

Riché died in Fontainebleau, France in 1878.

Work
Riché worked primarily in watercolor and her subject of choice was often women, flowers, or fruit. Her portraits were often done in oil; the stylistic preference of the times. Whereas her fruit and still life pieces were done in watercolor.

She painted a portrait of Natalia Obrenovich, Queen of Serbia.

Gallery

References

Adèle Riché on artnet

1791 births
1878 deaths
Painters from Paris
French women painters
19th-century French painters
Flower artists
19th-century French women artists